Accidentally in Love is the fifth studio album of Taiwan-born Malaysian Mandopop artist Freya Lim. It was released on 27 April 2012 by Rock Records.

The album has two editions on its initial release: the Arclight First Press Edition (吉光初回版) which includes pre-order gift choices of either an essential oil set (聊愛香氛組) or a cosmetics set (彩妝知己組), and the Eternal Hardcover Edition (永恆精裝版) which includes an autographed CD (聊愛音樂故事 Freya's shorts 為愛朗讀) and an essential oil set (聊愛香氛組). A repackaged version of the album (療愛聊愛夏日慶功版), released on 8 June 2012, contains a VIP pass to Freya's mini-concert at music cafe Good Cho's on 30 June 2012.

Track listing

Music videos
 "睡在一起的知己" (Intimate Friend) MV 
 "痛癢" (Nothing Unusual) MV 
 "告別像低迴溫婉的小調" (Whispered Goodbye) MV featuring singer-songwriter Adrian Fu
 "缺口" (Rift) MV featuring actor Danny Liang (梁正群)

Notes
  Rift (缺口) and Love Suddenly (幸福很突然) are interlude songs of Taiwan Sanlih E-Television SET Metro drama Gung Hay Fat Choy{我們發財了}
  Nothing Unusual (痛癢) is the ending theme song for Taiwan Public Television Service drama Man‧Boy (小孩大人)
  Whispered Goodbye (告別像低迴溫婉的小調) is the ending theme song of Korean drama Flower Boy Ramen Shop during its airing in Taiwan Videoland Television Network
  I Believe in You (你還在) is the ending theme song of Taiwan Chinese Television System drama Gentle Mercy (溫柔的慈悲)

References

External links
  Freya Lim@Rock Records Taiwan

2012 albums
Freya Lim albums
Rock Records albums
Mandopop albums